Antoine Raugel (born 14 February 1999) is a French cyclist, who currently rides for UCI WorldTeam .

Major results
2017
 National Junior Road Championships
1st  Road race
2nd Time trial
 1st Points classification, SPIE Internationale Juniorendriedaagse
 2nd Chrono des Nations Juniors
 4th Overall Sint-Martinusprijs Kontich
 10th La Classique des Alpes Juniors
 10th Grand Prix Bob Jungels
2018
 10th Paris–Roubaix Espoirs
 10th Trofeo Edil C
2019
 9th Trofeo Città di San Vendemiano
2021
 3rd Paris–Troyes
 5th Giro del Belvedere

Grand Tour general classification results timeline

References

External links

1999 births
Living people
French male cyclists
Sportspeople from Strasbourg
Cyclists from Grand Est